Nadia Nadim (born 2 January 1988) is a professional footballer and physician who plays as a striker for NWSL club Racing Louisville FC. Born in Afghanistan, she represents the Denmark national team at international level.

Nadim is considered the most influential and greatest Afghan female footballer of all time, particularly because she won the French league title in the 2020–21 season with Paris Saint-Germain.

Early life and career
Nadia was born in Herat and raised in Afghanistan until her father, an Afghan National Army (ANA) general, was executed by the Taliban in 2000. Her family then fled to Denmark, where she began her football career, playing for B52 Aalborg and Team Viborg.

Club career

Early career 
Nadim played for B52 Aalborg, Team Viborg from 2005 to 2006 and IK Skovbakken from 2006 to 2012, before moving to Fortuna Hjørring in 2012. She made her Champions League debut in September the same year, scoring both goals in a 2–1 win over Scottish Champions Glasgow City.

Sky Blue FC 
Nadim joined NWSL club Sky Blue FC near the end of the 2014 NWSL season. Playing in six games, she scored seven goals and registered three assists. She was named player of the week on 19 August and player of the month for the NWSL on 14 August. On 16 February 2015, Sky Blue announced that Nadim had been signed to play for Sky Blue in the 2015 season as well.

Portland Thorns FC
On 14 January 2016, Nadim was traded to Portland Thorns FC. Playing as a striker, she finished the 2016 season as the team's top scorer with nine goals in 20 games as the team won the 2016 NWSL Shield. In the 2017 season, she helped the team to a second-place finish in the league and victory in the NWSL Championship game.

Manchester City
On 28 September 2017, Nadim signed for FA Women's Super League side Manchester City for the 2018 season. She joined the club in January 2018, and made her debut with Manchester City on 7 January 2018 in a 5–2 win over Reading. After six minutes on the ground she scored her first goal for the team, and 26 minutes later she made an assist when Manchester City scored their second goal in the match. In her second match for the team she scored the winning goal in a 1–0 victory over Chelsea in the semi-final of the Continental Tyres Cup.

On 26 July 2018, while on the US tour with Manchester City, the BBC reported that Nadim had requested a transfer out of the club, stating that she had never felt at home there and wanted to leave. On 19 December 2018, Manchester City announced that Nadim would be departing the club and her contract would be terminated on 1 January 2019, allowing her to sign with another club.

Paris Saint-Germain 
On 3 January 2019, Nadim signed for Paris Saint-Germain.

On 9 July 2019, Nadim extended her contract for Paris Saint-Germain after a successful first season. She was later rewarded with the captain's armband and named the team's vice captain for the 2019–20 season. She scored 13 goals and made 13 assists in 16 league and cup games.

Racing Louisville FC 
On 9 June 2021, Nadim signed with Racing Louisville FC, returning to the NWSL four years after leaving Portland Thorns FC for Manchester City.

In September 2021, with the NWSL reeling from abuse scandals, she accused NJ/NY Gotham FC management of forging her signature on a contract extension so they could trade her rights to Portland in January 2016. She also accused league staffers of pressuring her to have a surgery for her season-ending ACL injury in the United States rather than abroad, threatening that "if something went wrong with the surgery outside of US they could consider taking actions against me."

International career

Under Danish nationality law Nadim could not apply for citizenship until turning 18 years old in 2006. When citizenship was eventually granted in 2008, FIFA eligibility rules blocked Nadim from playing for Denmark, because she had not yet been resident for the requisite five years after turning 18. A subsequent challenge from the Danish Football Association (DBU) led to FIFA's legal department making an exception to the rules in Nadim's case.

Nadim immediately became a member of the Denmark national team, making her debut in the 2009 Algarve Cup in a 2–0 defeat by the United States. In doing so, she became the first naturalised Dane to represent a Denmark senior national football team. She participated in all three of Denmark's games at UEFA European Championship 2009 in Finland.

She was named in national coach Kenneth Heiner-Møller's Denmark squad for UEFA European Championship 2013. In Denmark's opening group match against hosts Sweden Nadim featured as a substitute in an eventful 1–1 draw.

In the UEFA Women's Euro 2017 tournament, she was instrumental in Denmark's advancement, scoring the tying goal in Denmark's eventual 2–1 win over favorites Germany in the knockout stages, and scoring a go-ahead goal in the final, which Denmark ultimately lost to host Netherlands 4–2.

On 27 October 2020, Denmark had to win away against Italy to qualify for the UEFA European Championship 2022, and Nadim was crowned player of the match after scoring two crucial goals in Denmark's 3–1 win over Italy in Florence. The two goals secured Denmark's spot in the upcoming Euros.

On 24 June 2022, she played her 100th match for Denmark in a friendly match against Brazil.

Style of play
Nadim is recognized for her energetic and determined style of play. She is successful from the penalty spot, having converted all but one of her penalties in the NWSL (and with the one miss being a save by the goalkeeper and immediately scored by Nadim on the rebound) and both of her attempts at Euro 2017.

Outside football

Criticism of sportswashing of Qatar
In December 2021, Nadim received criticism in the media for describing Qatar as a nation that helps people in need. Her positive description of the desert state is conflicting with the general consensus in the Danish population and the opinion formulated by the Danish FA on the oppression of human rights and poor conditions for migrant workers in Qatar. Subsequently, Nadim denied having received money for her performance in Qatar, which turned out not to be true when Danish newspaper B.T. found out that she had received payment for attending the education summit in the country.

As a consequence of her role as an ambassador for World Cup in Qatar, Danish Refugee Council removed Nadim from her role as a goodwill ambassador.  Nadim stated on her Twitter that her collaboration with the Danish Refugee Council had been inactive since the beginning of 2019. However, B.T. proved this statement inaccurate.

Personal life and medical career
Nadim attended medical school at Aarhus University (remotely during the football season) with the aim of becoming a surgeon when her playing days are over. In 2020, she was assisting in surgery. She qualified as a doctor in January 2022.

Nadim is Muslim, and speaks nine languages.

Afghan singer Aryana Sayeed is her aunt.

In 2018, Forbes ranked her Number 20 in their "Most Powerful Women in International Sports" list.

Her mother, Hadima Nadim, was killed by a truck on 23 November 2022, aged 57. When Nadia learned that her mother had died, she departed during her work as a pundit for British broadcaster ITV at the Denmark–Tunisia match in the Men's World Cup.

Endorsements 
Nadia signed a representation contract with Nike in 2017, making her the first ever Danish female football player to be represented by Nike. Nike has used Nadia in many of their branches on top of doing work for the football department. She has also done commercials for Air Jordan as well as Nike's collaborations with Martine Rose. Besides her work with Nike, Nadia is also known for her work with Visa and Hugo Boss.

In 2016, Danish TV station DR released a four-episode long documentary about Nadia that followed her from Denmark to the United States, documenting her player development with the Portland Thorns.

In 2018, Danish publisher JP/Politiken published Nadia Nadim's autobiography called "Min Historie" which translates to "My Story". The book got nominated for Sports book of the year. The book was released in French on 26 May 2021, through the French publisher Hachette Book Group.

Career statistics

Honours
Portland Thorns FC
NWSL Shield: 2016 
NWSL Playoffs: 2017

Manchester City
FA WSL runners-up: 2017–18

Paris Saint-Germain
 Division 1 Féminine: 2020–21

Denmark
UEFA Women's Euro runners-up: 2017

Individual
Portland Thorns 2016 top goalscorer

Awards and recognition
In July 2019, Nadia Nadim was named UNESCO Champion for Girls and Women's Education. She received this recognition for her role in promoting sport and gender equality, her contribution to the Organization's educational action prioritizing young people and advocacy for girls and women's education at an international scale, among others.

References

Match reports

External links

 
 
 Profile at Sky Blue FC
 Profile at Portland Thorns FC

1988 births
Living people
Sportspeople from Herat
Sportspeople of Afghan descent
Afghan Muslims
Danish Muslims
Afghan emigrants to Denmark
Naturalised citizens of Denmark
Afghan women's footballers
Danish women's footballers
Women's association football forwards
VSK Aarhus (women) players
Fortuna Hjørring players
NJ/NY Gotham FC players
Portland Thorns FC players
Manchester City W.F.C. players
Paris Saint-Germain Féminine players
Racing Louisville FC players
Elitedivisionen players
National Women's Soccer League players
Women's Super League players
Division 1 Féminine players
Denmark women's international footballers
Danish expatriate women's footballers
Danish expatriate sportspeople in England
Danish expatriate sportspeople in the United States
Danish expatriate sportspeople in France
Expatriate women's soccer players in the United States
Expatriate women's footballers in England
Expatriate women's footballers in France
FIFA Century Club
UEFA Women's Euro 2022 players
UEFA Women's Euro 2017 players
Association football forwards
Denmark international footballers